The IWA Mid-South Television Championship was a short-lived title in the IWA Mid-South based in Louisville, Kentucky. The title appeared from 1997, when Rollin' Hard won a ten man Battle Royal to become the first ever champion.

Title history

See also 
 Independent Wrestling Association Mid-South

External links
IWA Mid-South Television Title History

IWA Mid-South championships